William Kenneth Payne (August 23, 1903 – July 26, 1963) served as president of Georgia State College from 1949 until his death in 1963.

Biography

Education
William Kenneth Payne graduated Morehouse College in 1923.

Early career
Payne, who was the dean of Georgia State College, became acting president when James A. Colston resigned in 1949.

President
Payne became president of Georgia State College in 1950. The first modern era building program was started during Payne’s tenure as President. Current campus buildings including Richard R. Wright Hall, Colston Hall, Wiley Gymnasium, and B. F. Hubert Technical Sciences Center were constructed during this period. Additionally, it was during his term that the institution’s name was changed to Savannah State College (September 1950).

President Payne died in August 1963 while in office.

Legacy
William K. Payne Hall, dedicated in 1966, has been the home of English, Social Studies, Social Work, Criminal Justice, and Sociology departments. Currently, the building houses the Department of English, Languages, and Cultures.

Suggested Reading
Hall, Clyde W (1991). One Hundred Years of Educating at Savannah State College, 1890–1990. East Peoria, Ill.: Versa Press.

References

Presidents of Savannah State University
1963 deaths
1903 births
People from Lowndes County, Alabama
20th-century African-American educators
20th-century American academics